Roland Haldi (born 12 January 1979 in Saanen) is a Swiss snowboarder. He placed 20th in the men's parallel giant slalom event at the 2010 Winter Olympics.

References

1979 births
Living people
Swiss male snowboarders
Olympic snowboarders of Switzerland
Snowboarders at the 2010 Winter Olympics